Isa Khan (Middle Bengali: , c. 1529 – September 1599) was the Bais Rajput leader of the 16th-century Baro-Bhuiyan chieftains of Bengal and a zamindar of Khizrpur. During his reign, he successfully unified the chieftains of Bengal and resisted the Mughal invasion of Bengal. It was only after his death that the region fell totally under Mughal control. He remains an iconic figure throughout Bangladesh as a symbol of his rebellious spirit and unity.

Early life and background
Khan was born in the 16th-century into an aristocratic Bengali Sunni Muslim zamindar family known as the Dewans of Sarail in the Bhati region of the Sultanate of Bengal. His grandfather, Dewan Bhagirath, belonged to a Bais Rajput clan from Ayodhya and settled in Sarail after being appointed as the Dewan of Sultan Ghiyasuddin Mahmud Shah of Bengal. His father, Dewan Sulaiman Khan (formerly Kalidas Gajdani), inherited this position and converted to Sunni Islam with the guidance of Ibrahim Danishmand, an Islamic scholar of Sonargaon. Isa Khan's mother, Syeda Momena Khatun, was the daughter of Sultan Mahmud Shah. His maternal aunt was married to Khidr Khan Surak. Isa had one younger brother, Ismail Khan, and one sister, Shahinsha Bibi.

Following the death of Sultan Mahmud Shah, Isa's father declared himself as the legal successor and revolted against the Sur Empire. He was later killed in battle.

According to Abul Fazl, a 16th-century historian and the author of Akbarnama:

Rise to power

With the help of Taj Khan, a Karrani ruler during 1564–1566, Isa obtained an estate in Sonargaon and Maheswardi Pargana in 1564 as a vassal of Karrani dynasty of Bengal. He gradually increased his power. In 1573 he helped Daud Khan Karrani in his expedition to Chittagong against Udai Manikya, the Maharaja of Tripura.

From the inscription on a cannon, it is known that by 1593-1594 Isa Khan was using the title Masnad-i-Ala. Various theories have been put forward regarding who might have been granted him the title. Historian Abdul Karim believes he assumed the title himself sometime after 1581–1582.

Military campaigns
The ruling of Karrani dynasty ended when Daud Khan was defeated in the Battle of Rajmahal in 1576. Isa started playing a leading role in the local resistance. In the end he successfully conquered Dhaka, Rangpur, Pabna, Tripura, parts of Mymensingh and Bogra. In 1577, Isa established Egarasindhur (in present-day Pakundia Upazila, Kishoreganj) as the political and trading centre. Forming a petty kingdom that remained independent. He declared himself as the ruler of the Bhati region in 1581–82. From Sarail, he shifted his administrative centre to Sonargaon. He built fortresses at Katrabo, Kalagachhia and Khizrpur near Sonargaon.

Battle against Khan Jahan
In 1578, Mughal Subahdar of Bengal, Subahdar Khan Jahan led an expedition towards the Bhati region and set camp in Bhawal. Isa faced the Mughal force led by Shah Bardi and Muhammad Quli on the Sarail-Juan Shahi border in Kastul on the bank of Meghna river. According to the Rajmala, Isa then quickly retreated to Tripura and sought assistance from the then Maharaja of Tripura, Amar Manikya. With the good grace of the queen Amrabati, the king granted an army of 52,000 to help Isa face the Mughals.

However, before Isa returned to Sarail, two zamindars – Majlis Pratap and Majlis Dilawar already attacked and defeated the Mughal forces under Khan Jahan. Muhammad Quli was captured but Shah Bardi fled to Bhawal camp. Khan Jahan retreated to the city of Tandah where he died on 19 December 1578 after a prolonged illness.

According to descriptions by Rajmala, Khan, who became the Zamindar of Sarail, sent one thousand labourers for Amar Manikya along with other Zamindars of Bengal in response to the request made by Manikya to excavate the Amar Sagar Dighi at around 1580 AD. Besides, as the naval commander of Manikya, Khan fought against the Zamindars of Taraf and Sylhet, Syed Musa and Fateh Khan respectively, in 1581.

Battle against Shahbaz Khan
In 1583, Mughal General Shahbaz Khan destroyed Isa's palace in Baktiarpur. In September 1584, the then-subahdar Shahbaz crossed Ganges near Khizirpur and attacked Sonargaon, Katrabo and Egarasindhur and pursued the defeated Pathan forces under Masum Kabuli up to Bikrampur in Dhaka, the cunning Isa then deluded negotiation of surrender and delayed the attack of Mughal general for several months. However, in 1584, Isa and Masum Khan Kabuli, deploying musket and gunpowder artilleries, launched a counterattack which finally defeated Shahbaz Khan in the naval and land battles of Egarasindur and Bhawal, and even killing one of Mughal general, then Shahbaz Khan retreated to Tandah.

Battle against Laksmana Singh Hajra
In 1585, he attacked two Koch rulers, Ram Hazra and Lakshman Hazra, and occupied their Jangalbari Fort (in present-day Karimganj Upazila, Kishoreganj).

Another source from local tradition was recorded that this happened in 1586 after Man Singh had defeated him in the battle of Egarasindhur. In the same year, Mughal Subahdar Shahbaz Khan again sent his forces against Isa to the south.

Second battle against Shahbaz Khan
With the help of reinforcements by Emperor Akbar, Shahbaz Khan led another military expedition towards Bhati in 1586. Isa attacked him at Bhawal (north of Dhaka) but forces of Shahbaz Khan were well fortified near Brahmaputra. Isa then chose to give allegiance towards Akbar and prevented an imminent invasion of Bengal by the Mughals.

He even promised the Mughals he would dispatch Ma'sum Khan Kabuli, the renegade to a compulsory Pilgrimage to Mecca, something that viewed as an act of banishment.

In late 1586, Ralph Fitch, an English traveler and merchant, came to Sonargaon, Bengal's eastern districts and stated,

Later on in 1588, he was involved in conflicts against Chand Rai and Kedar Rai.

Battle against Raghudev
Isa continued his campaign against the Koch dynasty. He fought and defeated Raghudev, the king of Koch Hajo, who ruled from Sankosh river in the west to the Bhareli river in the east on the north bank of the Brahmaputra river and rival to Koch Bihar kingdom which gained prominence after the latter's annexation by Mughal empire. Isa successfully captured portions of Raghudev's territory as far as Rangamati and Goalpara. However, later Isa Khan and Raghudev formed an alliance against the threat of Mughal invasion.

Battle against Durjan Singh
On 17 March 1594, Man Singh was appointed the Subahdar of Bengal by Emperor Akbar. After establishing Rajmahal as the capital of Bengal, Man Singh set out on 9 December 1595 to wrest the East Bengal delta from Isa Khan. Isa was emboldened to resist the Mughals after he successfully sought alliance with Raghudev, his former enemy and Kedar Rai, Zamindar of Bhusna in Faridpur. In the clash that took place in August 1597, Isa became engaged in a battle against Mughal naval forces with the assistance of Masum Khan Kabuli, an ex-Mughal defector. At first Isa faced defeat with the Mughals attacking Katrabo, one of Isa's pargana and city. However, on 5 September, Durjan Singh was killed and the Mughal forces were defeated. Both the army and navy of the Mughal-Koch Bihar alliance were either routed or captured.

It is recorded that in this clash, Isa personally fought Man Singh in a duel. However, the duel ended inconclusively when Isa Khan stopped fighting after Man Singh's sword broke. The noble gesture touched Man Singh and both men developed respect for each other which culminated into a friendship. Man Singh's respect for his rival was later made evident; when Isa sought to submit to the Mughal under a guarantee that it was wiser for Mughals not to incite a full invasion, Man Singh accompanied him to the Mughal court.

Administration
Due to his submission, Akbar assigned 22 parganas or administrative units under the ruling of Isa.

Marriage
Khan first married his maternal cousin Fatima Bibi, a daughter of his aunt Raushan Akhtar Banu and her husband Syed Ibrahim Danishmand. Later he married Sarnamoyee, the daughter of Chand Rai of Sripur. After her conversion to Islam, Sarnamoyee took the name Sona Bibi.

Descendants

Khan's son, Musa Khan, took control of Sonargaon after his death. On 10 July 1610 Musa was dethroned by Mughal General Islam Khan Chisti. After that, the descendants of Isa left Sonargaon and settled in Jangalbari Fort. Masum Khan was the eldest son of Musa Khan. Masum served as the Mughal army General during the Hughly invasion in 1632.
His eldest son was Monwar Khan. Monwar acted as the chief of the Bengal Zamindars' flotilla on the conquest of Chittagong in 1666. A village called Monwarbagh, in Bandar Upazila of Narayanganj District, was named after him. Haybat Khan, another grandson of Musa, established Haybatnagar (in present-day Kishoreganj district) and made it the centre of his land-lordship of seven parganas.

James Wise (d. 1886), a civil surgeon in Dhaka for 10 years, published a report on Baro-Bhuyans in Journal of the Asiatic Society of Bengal, Volume 43 in 1874. He found information from the account of his meeting with the descendants of Isa in Jangalbari and Haybatnagar. He addressed Isa as the Zamindar of Khizirpur. The Haybatnagar family had possessed  sent by Shah Shuja in 1649 and another one from Shaista Khan in 1667. Subhan Dad Khan had been the head of the family in Jangalbari in 1874. The other descendant of Haybatnagar family, Ilah Nawaz Khan, had died in Calcutta in 1872. Other branches of the family had settled in Jafarabad, Baghalpur, Mymensingh, Harishpur (Tripura), Katrabo (Dhaka), and Barisal. The wealth, property and Zamindari was distributed amongst the descendants which is why they each lived in different parts of the country.

Descendants such as Dewan Amin Dau Khan, Hazi Abdul Gani Khan and many more, have families who resides within Bangladesh even today.

As of 2005, Dewan Amin Dau Khan, the 14th descendant of Isa has been living in Jangalbari Fort in Egarasindur village. The fort seemed to have a circular front and had 40 rooms. The fort was mostly destroyed during an earthquake in 1893.

Death and legacy
So called alliance between Kedar Ray and Isa Khan turned into animosity as Isa Khan abducted Kedar's widow niece Swornomoyee. Rattled by this, Kedar Ray invaded Isha khan's capital, tearing down the Kalagachhia and other forts one after another up until his death in 1599. Frightened by Kedar Ray's attack, Isa soon fled to Medinipur. Kedar Ray continued to occupy the zamindari of Isa Khan. 
 
Khan died there in September 1599. His tomb remains in the village of Baktarpur in Kaliganj Upazila, Gazipur District of Bangladesh.

On 12 February 1909, a farmer unearthed seven cannons in Monwarbagh in Bandar, Narayanganj. The cannons were partly made of brass. They had labels "Isa Khan" and "1002" (Hijri 1002 year is 1593 CE in Gregorian Calendar). These cannons were made from the era of Sher Shah Suri who ruled Bengal before the Bara Bhuiyans while at least three cannons which carved with Isa Khan labels were made during the Baro-Bhuyans independent era.

Bangladesh Navy has named a base, BNS Issa Khan in his honour. The base, BNS Issa Khan, was the first Bangladesh Navy base to receive the national standard in 1974.

Popular culture

On 15 September 1992, Bangladesh issued a commemorative stamp in honour of Isa.

A jatra, named Isa Khan, depicting the life of Isa, written by Bhoironnath Gangopadhyay and directed by Mridul Kanti Dey, was staged on the premises of Bangladesh Lok O Karu Shilpa Foundation on 18 October 2012.

DA Tayeb made a movie named Isa Khan.

See also

 History of Bengal
 Karrani dynasty
 Khwaja Usman
 24 Parganas

Original sources

Primary
 Akbar-nama/Book of Akbar Volume 3:Ain-i-Akbari
 Memoirs of Bengal by Ralph Fitch
 Tarikh-i-Sher Shahi
 Chronicle of Bhara Buiyans by Baharistan-i-Ghaibi

Secondary
 NK Bhattasali, Bengal Chiefs' Struggle for Independence in the Reign of Akbar and Jahangir, Bengal Past and Present, 38, 1929;
 MA Rahim, The History of the Afghans in India, Karachi, 1961;
 Abdul Karim, History of Bengal (Mughal Period), I, Rajshahi, 1992.

References

Bengali zamindars
16th-century Bengalis
1529 births
1599 deaths
History of Bangladesh
People from Sarail Upazila
16th-century Indian Muslims
Bengali Muslims
Bengal Sultanate officers